Desert phebalium is a common name for several plants and may refer to:

Phebalium bullatum, endemic to southern Australia
Phebalium glandulosum, endemic to eastern Australia